Cox is an unincorporated community in Calhoun County, Florida, United States.  It is located on State Road 71.

Geography

References

Unincorporated communities in Calhoun County, Florida
Unincorporated communities in Florida